Psilogramma casuarinae, the Australasian privet hawk moth, is a moth of the family Sphingidae. The species was first described by Francis Walker in 1856. It is known from New South Wales, the Northern Territory and Queensland, all in Australia.

Adults have long, narrow grey wings with a darker grey wavy pattern. The abdomen is grey, with a dark dorsal line. Males can make a hissing sound by rubbing parts of their body together.

The larvae feed on Olea europaea, Ligustrum vulgare, Jasminum polyanthum, Campsis radicans, Tecoma stans, Lonicera japonica, Cotoneaster species, Antirrhinum majus and Clerodendrum paniculatum. Early instars are green (although there is a brown colour morph) with a strong nearly straight horn on the tail. Later, it develops a series of diagonal white stripes on the sides. Full-grown larvae are about 80 mm long. Mature larvae leave their food plant to pupate under the surface debris of loose soil and leaves.

References

Psilogramma
Moths described in 1856
Endemic fauna of Australia